Criminal Record is an upcoming crime thriller television series created by Paul Rutman.

Premise
Two detectives, one a seasoned veteran and the other early in their career, clash on an old murder case after an anonymous phone call draws them to it.

Cast
 Peter Capaldi as Detective Chief Inspector Daniel Hegarty
 Cush Jumbo as Detective Sgt. June Lenker
 Dionne Brown as Detective Constable Chloe Summers
 Stephen Campbell Moore as Leo
 Charlie Creed-Miles as Detective Sergeant Tony Gilfoyle
 Shaun Dooley as Detective Sergeant Kim Cardwell
 Aysha Kala as Sonya Singh
 Tom Moutchi as Errol Mathis
 Cathy Tyson as Doris Mathis
 Zoë Wanamaker as Maureen

Production
It was announced in June 2022 that Apple TV+ had ordered the series, which had begun production in London, with Peter Capaldi and Cush Jumbo starring. Paul Rutman will write, and Jim Loach will serve as director. Additional casting was announced in August 2022.

References

External links
 

2023 British television series debuts
2020s British crime drama television series
Apple TV+ original programming
British thriller television series
Crime thriller television series
English-language television shows
Television shows shot in London
Television shows set in London
Television series by STV Studios
Upcoming drama television series